Eucteniza relata, the southwestern trapdoor spider, is a species of wafer-lid trapdoor spider in the family Euctenizidae. It is found in the United States and Mexico.

References

Euctenizidae
Articles created by Qbugbot
Spiders described in 1895
Spiders of North America